Equestrian at the 2019 African Games was held from 21 to 24 August 2019 in Rabat, Morocco.

The event served as a qualifier for the 2020 Summer Olympics in Tokyo, Japan.

The team event was held on 21 and 22 August and the individual event was held on 21 and 24 August.

Participating nations

Medal table

Medal summary

References

External links 
 Results

2019 African Games
African Games
2019 African Games
Equestrian at the African Games